In probability theory, comonotonicity mainly refers to the perfect positive dependence between the components of a random vector, essentially saying that they can be represented as increasing functions of a single random variable. In two dimensions it is also possible to consider perfect negative dependence, which is called countermonotonicity. 

Comonotonicity is also related to the comonotonic additivity of the Choquet integral.

In particular, the sum of the components  is the riskiest if the joint probability distribution of the random vector  is comonotonic. Furthermore, the -quantile of the sum equals of the sum of the -quantiles of its components, hence comonotonic random variables are quantile-additive. In practical risk management terms it means that there is minimal (or eventually no) variance reduction from diversification.

Definitions

Comonotonicity of subsets of 

This means that  is a totally ordered set.

Comonotonicity of probability measures on 
Let  be a probability measure on the -dimensional Euclidean space  and let  denote its multivariate cumulative distribution function, that is

for every }. Then  is called comonotonic, if

Note that the probability measure  is comonotonic if and only if its support  is comonotonic according to the above definition.

Comonotonicity of -valued random vectors
An -valued random vector  is called comonotonic, if its multivariate distribution (the pushforward measure) is comonotonic, this means

Properties
An -valued random vector  is comonotonic if and only if it can be represented as

More generally, a random vector is comonotonic if and only if it agrees in distribution with a random vector where all components are non-decreasing functions (or all are non-increasing functions) of the same random variable.

Upper bounds

Upper Fréchet–Hoeffding bound for cumulative distribution functions

Let  be an -valued random vector. Then, for every },

hence

with equality everywhere if and only if  is comonotonic.

Upper bound for the covariance
Then it follows from Höffding's formula for the covariance and the upper Fréchet–Hoeffding bound that

and, correspondingly,

with equality if and only if  is comonotonic.

Note that this result generalizes the rearrangement inequality and Chebyshev's sum inequality.

See also
 Copula (probability theory)

Notes

Citations

References
 
 
 
 
 
 
 
 

Theory of probability distributions
Independence (probability theory)
Covariance and correlation